Runge–Kutta methods are methods for the numerical solution of the ordinary differential equation

Explicit Runge–Kutta methods take the form

Stages for implicit methods of s stages take the more general form, with the solution to be found over all s

Each method listed on this page is defined by its Butcher tableau, which puts the coefficients of the method in a table as follows:

.

Explicit methods

The explicit methods are those where the matrix  is lower triangular.

Forward Euler

The Euler method is first order. The lack of stability and accuracy limits its popularity mainly to use as a simple introductory example of a numeric solution method.

Explicit midpoint method

The (explicit) midpoint method is a second-order method with two stages (see also the implicit midpoint method below):

Heun's method

Heun's method is a second-order method with two stages.  It is also known as the explicit trapezoid rule, improved Euler's method, or modified Euler's method.  (Note: The "eu" is pronounced the same way as in "Euler", so "Heun" rhymes with "coin"):

Ralston's method

Ralston's method is a second-order method with two stages and a minimum local error bound:

Generic second-order method

Kutta's third-order method

Generic third-order method
See Sanderse and Veldman (2019).

for α ≠ 0, 1:

Heun's third-order method

Van der Houwen's/Wray third-order method

Ralston's third-order method

Ralston's third-order method is used in the embedded Bogacki–Shampine method.

Third-order Strong Stability Preserving Runge-Kutta (SSPRK3)

Classic fourth-order method

The "original" Runge–Kutta method.

3/8-rule fourth-order method

This method doesn't have as much notoriety as the "classic" method, but is just as classic because it was proposed in the same paper (Kutta, 1901).

Ralston's fourth-order method

This fourth order method has minimum truncation error.

Embedded methods
The embedded methods are designed to produce an estimate of the local truncation error of a single Runge–Kutta step, and as result, allow to control the error with adaptive stepsize. This is done by having two methods in the tableau, one with order p and one with order p-1.

The lower-order step is given by

Then the error is

The Butcher Tableau for this kind of method is extended to give the values of

Heun–Euler
The simplest adaptive Runge–Kutta method involves combining Heun's method, which is order 2, with the Euler method, which is order 1. Its extended Butcher Tableau is:

The error estimate is used to control the stepsize.

Fehlberg RK1(2) 
The Fehlberg method has two methods of orders 1 and 2. Its extended Butcher Tableau is:

The first row of b coefficients gives the second-order accurate solution, and the second row has order one.

Bogacki–Shampine

The Bogacki–Shampine method has two methods of orders 2 and 3. Its extended Butcher Tableau is:

The first row of b coefficients gives the third-order accurate solution, and the second row has order two.

Fehlberg

The Runge–Kutta–Fehlberg method has two methods of orders 5 and 4; it is sometimes dubbed RKF45 . Its extended Butcher Tableau is:
 

The first row of b coefficients gives the fifth-order accurate solution, and the second row has order four.
The coefficients here allow for an adaptive stepsize to be determined automatically.

Cash-Karp

Cash and Karp have modified Fehlberg's original idea. The extended tableau for the Cash–Karp method is

The first row of b coefficients gives the fifth-order accurate solution, and the second row has order four.

Dormand–Prince

The extended tableau for the Dormand–Prince method is

The first row of b coefficients gives the fifth-order accurate solution, and the second row gives the fourth-order accurate solution.

Implicit methods

Backward Euler

The backward Euler method is first order. Unconditionally stable and non-oscillatory for linear diffusion problems.

Implicit midpoint

The implicit midpoint method is of second order. It is the simplest method in the class of collocation methods known as the Gauss-Legendre methods. It is a symplectic integrator.

Crank-Nicolson method

The Crank–Nicolson method corresponds to the implicit trapezoidal rule and is a second-order accurate and A-stable method.

Gauss–Legendre methods

These methods are based on the points of Gauss–Legendre quadrature. The Gauss–Legendre method of order four has Butcher tableau:

The Gauss–Legendre method of order six has Butcher tableau:

Diagonally Implicit Runge–Kutta methods 

Diagonally Implicit Runge–Kutta (DIRK) formulae have been widely used for the numerical solution of stiff initial value problems;

the advantage of this approach is that here the solution may be found sequentially as opposed to simultaneously.

The simplest method from this class is the order 2 implicit midpoint method.

Kraaijevanger and Spijker's two-stage Diagonally Implicit Runge–Kutta method:

Qin and Zhang's two-stage, 2nd order, symplectic Diagonally Implicit Runge–Kutta method:

Pareschi and Russo's two-stage 2nd order Diagonally Implicit Runge–Kutta method:

This Diagonally Implicit Runge–Kutta method is A-stable if and only if .  Moreover, this method is L-stable if and only if  equals one of the roots of the polynomial , i.e. if .

Two-stage 2nd order Diagonally Implicit Runge–Kutta method:

Again, this Diagonally Implicit Runge–Kutta method is A-stable if and only if .  As the previous method, this method is again L-stable if and only if  equals one of the roots of the polynomial , i.e. if .

Crouzeix's two-stage, 3rd order Diagonally Implicit Runge–Kutta method:

Crouzeix's three-stage, 4th order Diagonally Implicit Runge–Kutta method:

Three-stage, 3rd order, L-stable Diagonally Implicit Runge–Kutta method:

with 

Nørsett's three-stage, 4th order Diagonally Implicit Runge–Kutta method has the following Butcher tableau:

with  one of the three roots of the cubic equation . The root  gives the best stability properties for initial value problems.

Four-stage, 3rd order, L-stable Diagonally Implicit Runge–Kutta method

Lobatto methods

There are three main families of Lobatto methods, called IIIA, IIIB and IIIC (in classical mathematical literature, the symbols I and II are reserved for two types of Radau methods).  These are named after Rehuel Lobatto as a reference to the Lobatto quadrature rule, but were introduced by Byron L. Ehle in his thesis.  All are implicit methods, have order 2s − 2 and they all have c1 = 0 and cs = 1.  Unlike any explicit method, it's possible for these methods to have the order greater than the number of stages. Lobatto lived before the classic fourth-order method was popularized by Runge and Kutta.

Lobatto IIIA methods

The Lobatto IIIA methods are collocation methods. The second-order method is known as the trapezoidal rule:

The fourth-order method is given by

These methods are A-stable, but not L-stable and B-stable.

Lobatto IIIB methods

The Lobatto IIIB methods are not collocation methods, but they can be viewed as discontinuous collocation methods . The second-order method is given by

The fourth-order method is given by

Lobatto IIIB methods are A-stable, but not L-stable and B-stable.

Lobatto IIIC methods

The Lobatto IIIC methods also are discontinuous collocation methods. The second-order method is given by

The fourth-order method is given by

They are L-stable. They are also algebraically stable and thus B-stable, that makes them suitable for stiff problems.

Lobatto IIIC* methods

The Lobatto IIIC* methods are also known as Lobatto III methods (Butcher, 2008), Butcher's Lobatto methods (Hairer et al., 1993), and Lobatto IIIC methods (Sun, 2000) in the literature. The second-order method is given by

Butcher's three-stage, fourth-order method is given by

These methods are not A-stable, B-stable or L-stable.

Generalized Lobatto methods
One can consider a very general family of methods with three real parameters  by considering Lobatto coefficients of the form
,
where
.
For example, Lobatto IIID family introduced in (Nørsett and Wanner, 1981), also called Lobatto IIINW, are given by

and

The methods are L-stable. They are algebraically stable and thus B-stable.

Radau methods

Radau methods are fully implicit methods (matrix A of such methods can have any structure). Radau methods attain order 2s − 1 for s stages. Radau methods are A-stable, but expensive to implement. Also they can suffer from order reduction.
The first order Radau method is similar to backward Euler method.

Radau IA methods
The third-order method is given by

The fifth-order method is given by

Radau IIA methods
The ci of this method are zeros of
. 
The third-order method is given by

The fifth-order method is given by

Notes

References
 
 .
 .
 .

Numerical differential equations
Mathematics-related lists